Erich Hans Rothe (July 21, 1895, Berlin – February 19, 1988, Ann Arbor, Michigan) was a German-born American mathematician, who did research in mathematical analysis, differential equations, integral equations, and mathematical physics. He is known for the Rothe method (also known as the method of lines or the method of semidiscretization) used for solving evolution equations.

Biography
Rothe, whose father was a lawyer, attended Berlin's Königliches Wilhelms-Gymnasium and passed his Abitur in October 1913. After completing two semesters at the University of Munich, he volunteered to join the German Army in a field artillery regiment. He was wounded in the Battle of Verdun and was discharged from the German Army in December 1918. In 1919 he continued his mathematical studies for one semester at the Technical University of Berlin (TU Berlin) and then transferred to Berlin's Friedrich-Wilhelms-Universität (Friedrich Wilhelm University, now called the Humboldt University of Berlin). There he studied mathematics, physics, and philosophy and in 1923 passed the Lehramtsexamen qualifying him to become a Gymnasium teacher. From 1923 to 1926 he taught at Berlin's Mommsen-Gymnasium. In 1927 he received his Promotion from TU Berlin. His dissertation Über einige Analogien zwischen linearen partiellen und linearen gewöhnlichen Differentialgleichungen (About some analogies between linear partial and linear ordinary differential equations) was supervised by Erhard Schmidt and Richard von Mises. Rothe worked from 1926 to 1927 at the Institute of Applied Mathematics of the Friedrich Wilhelm University. In 1928 he married the mathematician Hildegard Ille (1899–1942). From 1928 to 1931 he was a Privatdozent and Assistent under Fritz Noether at the Technische Hochschule Breslau. There he received his Habilitation in 1928. From 1931 to  1935 he was a Privatdozent at the University of Breslau. There he received his Umhabilitation in 1931). During the time he held positions in Breslau, he took study leave for a year at the University of Göttingen. In Breslau in April 1931 Hildegard Rothe gave birth to Erhard W. Rothe.

After being dismissed in 1935 from the German civil service because he was a Jew, Rothe with his wife and son escaped to Zurich and in emigrated in 1937 to the USA. From 1937 to 1943 he taught mathematics (with a very small salary) at William Penn College (now William Penn University) in Oskaloosa, Iowa. His wife died of cancer in December 1942. At the University of Michigan, Rothe was an assistant professor from 1944 to 1949, an associate professor from 1949 to 1955, and a full professor from 1955 to 1964, when he retired as professor emeritus. In retirement, he taught at the University of Michigan–Dearborn and in the academic year 1967–1968 at Western Michigan University (WMU). During his year at WMU, Rothe helped to develop the PhD program for WMU's mathematics department, which awarded its first PhD in December 1969.

Rothe published more than 50 mathematical papers. He was a co-author, with Hans Rademacher, of chapter 19 of the 7th edition of Die Differential- und Integralgleichungen der Mechanik und Physik. In 1986 at the age of 91, Rothe published the 242-page book Introduction to Various Aspects of Degree Theory in Banach Spaces.

In addition to the Rothe Method, he is also known for his theorem, proven in 1937, that a functional in a Hilbert space is weakly continuous if and only if its Fréchet derivative is a completely continuous operator and for Rothe's fixed point theorem, proven in 1937. In 1978 a collection of papers was published in his honor. His doctoral students include Jane Cronin Scanlon and George J. Minty.

Upon his death, Erich Rothe was survived by his son and two granddaughters.

Selected publications

References

External links
 

20th-century German mathematicians
20th-century American mathematicians
American people of German-Jewish descent
Humboldt University of Berlin alumni
William Penn University faculty
University of Michigan faculty
1895 births
1988 deaths
German emigrants to the United States